Three on a match (also known as third on a match or unlucky third light) is a purported superstition among soldiers during the Crimean War to World War II. The superstition goes that if three soldiers lit their cigarettes from the same match, one of the three would be killed or that the man who was third on the match would be shot. Since then, it has been considered bad luck for three people to share a light from the same match. This superstition has become part of popular Western culture in films, novels and other art forms.

The putative basis of the superstition
The belief was that when the first soldier lit his cigarette, the enemy would see the light; when the second soldier lit his cigarette from the same match, the enemy would take aim at the target; and when the third soldier lit his cigarette from the match, the enemy would fire, and that soldier would be shot.

Possible origins

First World War theory
No references have been found to the superstition during the First World War, though its first known appearance in the United States was a year after the end of the war.  An editorial in the Grand Rapids Leader, 17 December 1919, muses, "Why should we be superstitious? Three on a match, or a black cat crossing the road in front of us, or looking [at] the moon over the left shoulder, have not altered results in anyone's case." A cartoon two years later portrayed an insect attempting to climb on to a floating match already occupied by two beetles. The caption reads, "Get off of here! Don't you know that three on a match is unlucky?"

The "Ivar Kreuger" theory
The superstition is popularly alleged to have been invented in the mid- to late 1920s by the Swedish match tycoon Ivar Kreuger in an attempt to get people to use more matches, but it appears he merely made very shrewd use of the already existing belief, which may date to the Boer War.

Russian funeral rite theory
In the 1916 novel The Wonderful Year, the following explanation is given: "It arises out of the Russian funeral ritual in which the three altar candles are lit by the same taper. To apply the same method of illumination to three worldly things, like cigars or cigarettes, is regarded as an act of impiety and hence as unlucky."

Mexican superstition theory
An article by John G. Bourke, January 5, 1894, describes the superstition among the Mexican population of the Rio Grande region in the southern United States near Fort Ringgold, Texas: "Numbers—If three men light their cigarillos from the same match, bad luck will surely overtake one of them soon. (Alberto Leal.)"

Usage in popular media

 In the 1937 film The Last of Mrs Cheyney, Robert Montgomery attempts to light the cigarettes of Joan Crawford, William Powell (partnered thieves) then himself when William Powell's character warns him, "Milord. Uh, not three." Montgomery's character thanks him, blows out the cigarette lighter flame, and lights it again before lighting his own cigarette.
 In Joseph von Sternberg's 1928 silent film The Docks of New York one character offers the male and female leads each a cigarette, then takes one for himself.  He strikes a match and lights his, then the male lead's, then slowly extends the match to the woman.  She knocks his hand away, claiming he was trying to bring her bad luck.
 First National Pictures released a film in 1932 called The Match King, starring Warren William; it was loosely based on the life of the Swedish match tycoon Ivar Kreuger and depicts the protagonist creating the "three on a match" superstition in order to sell more matches.
 The 1932 Hollywood film Three on a Match made use of the superstition, but also had a graphic of a "Believe It or Not" newspaper clip that explains Kreuger's exploitation of the superstition. The character in the film who is "third on the match" does die at the end of the picture and the final scene depicts the surviving two sharing a match.
 The 1939 Hollywood film At the Circus makes reference to the superstition when Groucho Marx refuses Chico Marx's offer of lighting his cigar, by way of a midget, by saying "Ah ah! Bad luck, three on a midget!"
 The 1941 Hollywood film Dive Bomber includes a scene during the initial character introductions where Fred MacMurray quickly blows out the match when another pilot attempts to light a third cigarette, then takes a lighter out of his own pocket to finish the job.
 The 1945 Hollywood film Scarlet Street had this as a piece of foreshadowing in the opening scene.  When two men light their cigars, Chris (Edward G. Robinson) is offered to light his as well, but hesitates. At that, his boss puts in the dig, "What's wrong? You aren't superstitious, are you, Chris?"
 The 1946 Hollywood film The Best Years of Our Lives makes reference to the superstition, as the three protagonists (Captain Fred Derry, Sergeant Al Stephenson and sailor Homer Parrish) are returning to their hometown in the nose of a B-17. After lighting Fred and Al's cigarettes with a match, Homer asks if anyone is superstitious, and although his compatriots reply that they aren't, Homer states that he is and uses another match to light his own cigarette.
 The climax of the Popeye short subject "I Don't Scare" sees Popeye using this superstition, among others, to his advantage by lighting three sticks of dynamite in Bluto's mouth.
 The satirical 1983 British film Bullshot starts out in the trenches of World War I with the hero of the story, Captain Hugh "Bullshot" Crummond, explaining/demonstrating the concept of "three on a match" to some of the young soldiers under his command. At the conclusion of his explanation, the third soldier is shot and killed by a sniper.
 American television series Mad Men referenced the superstition in Season 1, Episode 7 ("Red in the Face"). While Roger Sterling, Jr. refers to the "original" World War I superstition, the character of Don Draper makes light of it, referring to Kreuger's canny marketing ploy. including the fact that it was used in an attempt to sell more matches.
 The Perry Mason story (and the TV series episode based on it) The Case of the Howling Dog have a reference to 'three cigarettes one match'. Perry Mason uses one match to light Della Street's cigarette then Paul Drake's cigarette and is prevented from lighting his own with the same match by Della Street.
 In Dario Argento's film The Stendhal Syndrome, a character stops short of lighting a third candle from one flame, calling it "unlucky".
 The Edwin McCain song "Take Me" from the album Misguided Roses uses extensive metaphors about warfare, including the verse: "Well, now, three on a match is suicide / In the foxhole of my mind / And way off in the distance / The air raid sirens whine."
 In a flashback during the Archer episode "The Double Deuce" to Woodhouse's time in World War I, the pilot to whom Woodhouse served as a personal assistant (and developed romantic feelings towards) was killed after asking Woodhouse for a cigarette and the latter lighting it three times (though with different matches) causing an enemy sniper to spot him, take aim and fire with each lighting.
 Bob in Stephen Chbosky's novel The Perks of Being a Wallflower says that you can't have three on a match because then they'd find you.
 Nas's song, "What Goes Around" from his album Stillmatic may reference the superstition in his extensive critique on the negativity prevalent in modern society, saying "You know, the usual, death comes in threes."  It is far more likely that Nas is referring to the superstition that bad things (including deaths) come in threes.
 Eddie Bell, a character in Early Doors, a pub sitcom, blows out landlord Ken Dixon's match when he is third in line to have his celebratory King Edward cigar lit, much to Ken's chagrin.
 In the 2004 French film Clara et moi, Antoine associates this superstition with his girlfriend having been tested positive for HIV, since he lit her cigarette which was third in a row with the same matchstick and forbids his friend from doing so at another point in the film.
 The Alarm song "Third Light" from the album Declaration includes the verse: "First light: the sniper saw you / second light: took careful aim / third light: he pulled that trigger / on the gun / Dead dead dead."
 The Cold Shoulder (band) song "Third On A Match" is a song about a man hooking up with a woman after a night of drinking. She later claims she is "Third on a match".  This reference marks the end of his care free single days (likely due to an unexpected pregnancy). 
 The Foxing (band) song "Three on A Match" from the album "Dealer" (2015) is a direct reference to the superstition.
 Alt-country band Old 97s have a song called "Bad Luck Charm" on their album "Graveyard Whistling" (2017) which contains the lines "You might think I'm a hell of a catch // But lightin' my fire's like three on a match // And it's between the devil you and me."
In Stephen King's 1986 novel 'It' during Eddie Kaspbrak's flashback scene in Chapter 7, the ten-eleven year old stuttering  Bill Denbrough stopped his friend Richie Tozier from lighting a 3rd cigarette from the same match, saying, "The-The-Three on a muh-muh-hatch. B-Bad luh-luh-luck."
 In 2020 Netflix ran a movie starring Adam Sandler called  “Hubie Halloween”. Adam Sandler’s character named “Hubie Dubois” ends up briefly working undercover for the Salem Massachusetts Police Department. In the second half of the film a scared Hubie is sent out to speak with a suspected murderer, when  he begins to nervously mumble into his microphone that is being heard by two of the police officers. He says “Bogey on my Twelve”, “Three on a match” and “Smoke ‘em if you got ‘em”, confusing the two policemen listening to him.

See also
 Urban legend

References

Luck
Superstitions about numbers
Cigarettes